Spend It may refer to:

 "Spend It", a 2011 song by 2 Chainz
 "Spend It", a 2019 song by Iggy Azalea from In My Defense
 "Spend It", a 2010 song by Mulatto from Queen of Da Souf